Walter Häfner (born 3 May 1944) is a former West German pair skater. With partner Gudrun Hauss, he finished fourth at both the 1967 European Figure Skating Championships and World Figure Skating Championships.  They finished eighth at the 1968 Winter Olympics and won the gold medal at the German Figure Skating Championships in 1969.

Results
(with Hauss)

References
Sports-Reference.com

1944 births
German male pair skaters
Figure skaters at the 1968 Winter Olympics
Olympic figure skaters of West Germany
Living people